Polotsk Airport (also Polotsk South) is a civilian airfield in Belarus, located 9 km south of Polotsk.

Airlines and destinations
There are no regularly-scheduled services at the airport.

References

RussianAirFields.com

Airports built in the Soviet Union
Airports in Belarus
Polotsk
Buildings and structures in Vitebsk Region